Désirée is a 1954 American historical romance film directed by Henry Koster and produced by Julian Blaustein from a screenplay by Daniel Taradash, based on the best-selling novel Désirée by Annemarie Selinko. The music score was by Alex North and the cinematography by Milton R. Krasner. The film was made in CinemaScope.

It stars Marlon Brando as Napoleon Bonaparte and Jean Simmons as Désirée Clary. It also stars Merle Oberon and Michael Rennie with Cameron Mitchell, Elizabeth Sellars, Charlotte Austin, Cathleen Nesbitt, Carolyn Jones and Evelyn Varden.

The film was nominated for two Academy Awards, for Best Art Direction (color) (Lyle R. Wheeler, Leland Fuller, Walter M. Scott, Paul S. Fox) and Best Costume Design (René Hubert and Charles LeMaire).

Plot

In 1794, in Marseille, Désirée Clary makes the acquaintance of a Corsican, Joseph Bonaparte, and invites him and his brother, Captain Napoleon Bonaparte, to call upon the family the following day. The next day, Julie, Désirée's sister, and Joseph are immediately attracted to each other, and Napoleon is taken with Désirée.  He admits to her that the poor Bonaparte brothers need the rich dowries of the Clary sisters.  Later, Désirée learns that Napoleon has been arrested and taken to Paris.

Napoleon eventually returns to Marseille, tells Désirée that he has been cleared of all charges, but has been ordered to track down Bourbon royalists in Paris.  Désirée begs Napoleon to leave the Army and join her brother in business, but he scoffs at the idea and instead proposes marriage.  Désirée accepts and lends Napoleon the money to return to Paris.

Napoleon tells her that he will always love her and will return soon for their wedding, but, as the months pass, Désirée starts doubting him and goes to the city where she meets General Jean-Baptiste Bernadotte. She learns that Napoleon is engaged to the wealthy Joséphine de Beauharnais. Désirée contemplates suicide, but Bernadotte, who has fallen in love with her, stops her.

Later, in 1797, Napoleon, now France's leading general, has succeeded in conquering Italy, and Désirée lives in Rome with Julie and Joseph.  She soon tires of Rome, however, and decides to return to Paris, where she meets Napoleon, now married to Josephine, who announces that he will be leaving for a new campaign in Egypt.  Bernadotte is thrilled to see Désirée again and proposes marriage to her.

By July 4, 1799, Désirée and Bernadotte have happily settled into married life and have a son, Oscar (Nicholas Koster).  On November 9, 1799, Napoleon is proclaimed First Consul of the French Republic and asks Bernadotte to join his council of state, and Bernadotte agrees.

Several years later, Napoleon is proclaimed emperor, and at his coronation, he takes the crown from the hands of Pope Pius VII and crowns himself.

Five years later, desperate for an heir, Napoleon divorces Josephine, and Désirée comforts her former rival, before Napoleon's upcoming marriage to the 18-year-old Marie Louise of Austria. Napoleon involves France in more wars, and Bernadotte is approached by representatives of King Charles XIII of Sweden, who wishes to adopt him and make him the heir to the throne.  Désirée, stunned by the news that she will one day be a queen, nevertheless supports her husband, and eventually Napoleon allows both of them to leave Paris.

In Stockholm, Désirée does not fit in with the royal family and asks to go home.  Eight months later, she attends a ball in Paris at which Napoleon shows off his new son.  Napoleon makes veiled threats about Bernadotte's alliance with Russia and announces to the crowd that she will be held hostage to ensure Sweden's support while his army invades Russia and captures Moscow.

Napoleon's army is defeated, and he visits Désirée, asking her to write a letter to Bernadotte, requesting his help.  Désirée realizes that Napoleon still loves her and came more for her than to seek her husband's help.  Soon after, during the War of the Sixth Coalition, Bernadotte leads one of the armies that overwhelms Napoleon, and the triumphant general reunites with Désirée before returning to Sweden.

Napoleon's exile to Elba is short-lived, however, and after the Battle of Waterloo, Napoleon retreats with his personal army to the Château de Malmaison.  Representatives of the allied armies ask Désirée to speak with Napoleon, hoping that she can persuade him to surrender.  Napoleon agrees to speak with Désirée alone, and muses on what his destiny would have been if he had married her.  Napoleon proclaims that he has given his life to protect France, but Désirée gently tells him that he must do as France asks and go into exile on St. Helena.  Commenting on how strange it is that the two most outstanding men of their time had fallen in love with her, Napoleon gives Désirée his sword in surrender and assures her that her dowry was not the only reason that he proposed to her many years ago in Marseille.

Cast

 Marlon Brando as Napoleon Bonaparte
 Jean Simmons as Désirée Clary
 Merle Oberon as Joséphine de Beauharnais
 Michael Rennie as Jean-Baptiste Bernadotte
 Cameron Mitchell as Joseph Bonaparte
 Elizabeth Sellars as Julie Clary
 Charlotte Austin as Paulette
 Cathleen Nesbitt as Mme. Bonaparte 
 Evelyn Varden as Marie
 Isobel Elsom as Madame Clary
 John Hoyt as Talleyrand
 Alan Napier as Despereaux

Uncredited 
 Nicholas Koster as Oscar
 Richard Deacon as Etienne
 Edith Evanson as Queen Hedwig
 Carolyn Jones as Mme. Tallien
 Sam Gilman as Fouché
 Larry Craine as Louis Bonaparte
 Judy Lester as Caroline Bonaparte
 Louis Borel as Baron Morner
 Peter Bourne as Count Brahe 
 Dorothy Neumann as Queen Sofia 
 Violet Rensing as Marie Louise of Austria

Reception
The film received mixed reviews from critics. Bosley Crowther of The New York Times wrote: "A great deal of handsome decoration and two talented and attractive stars have been put into the CinemaScope production of the historical romance 'Desiree.' The only essential missing is a story of any consequence ... Mr. Taradash's script is quite positive in indicating that Napoleon loved the girl in the first flush of his ascendancy. But then it permits the amorous passion to appear to die, and there is not much in this line to intrigue the viewer until the end of the film." Variety called the film "easily one of the best and most potent costumers to come along in the widescreen age," and called Brando's performance "a masterful exhibition of thesping." Harrison's Reports called it "an engrossing entertainment, with exceptionally fine performances." Richard L. Coe of The Washington Post called the film "a feast to the eyes and a torture to the ears, intelligence and sensibilities," and called Brando's performance "better than 'Desiree' deserves." John McCarten of The New Yorker wrote, "There's a lot of colorful stuff on view—palace fêtes, lovely gardens and so on—but the plot is practically invisible." The Monthly Film Bulletin wrote: "As Napoleon, Marlon Brando is given little opportunity to do more than wear the uniforms and strike the familiar attitudes ... although the performance is tentative and uneasy, he carries off some scenes with authority, a suggestion of muffled power, that perhaps indicates what he might have been able to make of the character in a film more ambitiously and imaginatively conceived."

Notes
The story of Désirée was the subject of an earlier film, Le Destin fabuleux de Désirée Clary, made in 1942 by Sacha Guitry.

References

External links

 
 
 Désirée Clary
 The story of Desiree (ger.)

1954 films
1950s biographical drama films
1950s historical drama films
Films set in 1794
Films set in 1797
Films set in 1799
Films set in 1812
Films set in 1814
American biographical drama films
American historical drama films
American historical romance films
French Revolutionary Wars films
Napoleonic Wars films
Films about Napoleon
Biographical films about French royalty
Biographical films about Swedish royalty
20th Century Fox films
1950s English-language films
Films scored by Alex North
Films directed by Henry Koster
Films based on Austrian novels
Cultural depictions of Joséphine de Beauharnais
Cultural depictions of Charles Maurice de Talleyrand-Périgord
1954 drama films
CinemaScope films
1950s American films
1950s historical romance films